Stipa coronata, formerly classified as Achnatherum coronatum, is a greenish species of grass known by the common name crested needlegrass, giant ricegrass, and giant stipa.

Distribution
The grass is native to southern California and Baja California, where it grows on the coastal and inland hills, often in chaparral, oak woodland, and yellow pine forest plant communities. Stipa coronatum is found in the Peninsular Ranges, Transverse Ranges, southern Outer California Coast Ranges, and the Channel Islands.

Description
The clumps expand by short rhizomes. This species is similar to its inland relative, Stipa parishii, and occasionally the two intergrade in characteristics and are easily confused.

The grass bears a generous inflorescence up to 60 centimeters long with large spikelets up to 2 centimeters long each, not including an awn of up to 4.5 centimeters. The awn has two distinct kinks.

See also
California chaparral and woodlands
California coastal sage and chaparral
California montane chaparral and woodlands
California oak woodland
Native grasses of California

References

External links
Jepson Manual Treatment: Stipa coronata
USDA Plants Profile: Achnatherum coronatum (Stipa coronata) — (giant ricegrass)
Grass Manual Treatment
Stipa coronata (Achnatherum coronatum) — U.C. Photo gallery

coronatum
Bunchgrasses of North America
Native grasses of California
Grasses of Mexico
Flora of Baja California
Natural history of the California chaparral and woodlands
Natural history of the California Coast Ranges
Natural history of the Channel Islands of California
Natural history of the Peninsular Ranges
Natural history of the Santa Monica Mountains
Natural history of the Transverse Ranges